Symphytognatha is a genus of dwarf orb-weavers that was first described by V. V. Hickman in 1931.

Species
 it contains fifteen widely dispersed species:
Symphytognatha blesti Forster & Platnick, 1977 – Australia (New South Wales)
Symphytognatha brasiliana Balogh & Loksa, 1968 – Brazil
Symphytognatha cabezota Dupérré & Tapia, 2017 – Ecuador
Symphytognatha carstica Brescovit, Álvares & Lopes, 2004 – Brazil
Symphytognatha chickeringi Forster & Platnick, 1977 – Jamaica
Symphytognatha fouldsi Harvey, 2001 – Australia (Western Australia)
Symphytognatha gertschi Forster & Platnick, 1977 – Mexico
Symphytognatha globosa Hickman, 1931 (type) – Australia (Tasmania)
Symphytognatha goodnightorum Forster & Platnick, 1977 – Belize
Symphytognatha imbulunga Griswold, 1987 – South Africa
Symphytognatha milleri Lin, 2019 – China
Symphytognatha orghidani Georgescu, 1988 – Cuba
Symphytognatha picta Harvey, 1992 – Australia (Western Australia)
Symphytognatha tacaca Brescovit, Álvares & Lopes, 2004 – Brazil
Symphytognatha ulur Platnick, 1979 – New Guinea

See also
 List of Symphytognathidae species

References

Araneomorphae genera
Cosmopolitan spiders
Symphytognathidae